This is a list of shootings at synagogues.

1956 Shafrir synagogue shooting attack 
1960 Congregation Beth Israel (Gadsden, Alabama). Gunman injured two worshippers after fire-bombing synagogue.
1977 Shaare Zedek Synagogue (University City, Missouri): Shooting
1986 Neve Shalom Synagogue. During Shabbat services gunmen killed 22 worshippers and wounded 6.
1981 Vienna synagogue attack
1982 Great Synagogue of Rome attack
2014 Jerusalem synagogue attack
2015 Copenhagen shootings
2018 Pittsburgh synagogue shooting 
2019 Poway synagogue shooting
2019 Halle synagogue shooting
2022 Colleyville synagogue hostage crisis
2023 East Jerusalem synagogue shooting

See also
List of attacks on Jewish institutions in the United States

References